Nineteen Naughty Nine: Nature's Fury is the fifth studio album by Naughty by Nature, which was released on April 27, 1999, as their first and only album for Arista Records. The album was a success, peaking at 22 on the Billboard 200 and produced a big comeback hit for the group with "Jamboree", which reached #10 on the Billboard Hot 100.

Three additional singles, "Dirt All By My Lonely", "Live or Die" and "Holiday", all had minor success on the charts.

Due to drama with Treach involving the group's finances, DJ Kay Gee would leave the group a year and a half following the album's release until May 2006.

Track listing 
 "Intro" – 0:35
 "Ring the Alarm" – 3:57
 "Dirt All By My Lonely" – 3:14
 "Holiday" (featuring Phiness) – 4:08
 "Live or Die" (featuring Master P, Silkk the Shocker, Mystikal and Phiness) – 3:41
 "On the Run" – 3:21
 "Radio" (featuring Rustic Overtones) – 4:37
 "Jamboree" (featuring Zhané) – 3:34
 "Would've Done the Same for Me" (featuring Koffee Brown) – 4:18
 "Thugs & Hustlers" (featuring Mag, Krayzie Bone) – 3:28
 "Work" (featuring Mag, Castro) – 3:20
 "We Could Do It" (featuring Big Pun) – 4:48
 "The Blues" (featuring Next) – 3:49
 "Wicked Bounce" – 3:54
 "Live Then Lay" (featuring Phiness) – 4:01
 "The Shivers" (featuring Chain Gang Platune) – 4:57

Chart performance

Weekly charts

Year-end charts

Singles

References 

1999 albums
Naughty by Nature albums
Arista Records albums